These are the Canadian number-one country albums of 1984, per the RPM Country Albums chart.

1984
1984 record charts